"The End Is the Beginning" is an episode of the television series Fear the Walking Dead.

The End Is the Beginning may also refer to:

Television episodes
 "The End Is the Beginning" (Kesha: My Crazy Beautiful Life)
 "The End Is the Beginning" (Star Trek: Picard)
 "The End Is the Beginning" (Voltron: Legendary Defender)

Other media
 The End Is the Beginning, an album by Joel Futterman, 1980
 "The End Is the Beginning", a song by Two Steps from Hell from SkyWorld, 2012
 "The End Is the Beginning", the third section of the 1981 novel The Quiet Earth by Craig Harrison
 Dark Avengers: The End Is the Beginning, a 2013 collected edition of Dark Avengers comics

See also
 "The End Is the Beginning Is the End", a 1997 song by the Smashing Pumpkins
 "The End Is the Beginning Is the End" (Grey's Anatomy), a television episode
 The End of the Beginning (disambiguation)
 The Beginning of the End (disambiguation)